is a Japanese company and constituent of the  Nikkei 225 stock index.

History

The company was founded in 1887 as the Tokyo Jinzo Hiryo (Tokyo Artificial Fertilizer Company) by Jokichi Takamine, Eiichi Shibusawa and Takashi Masuda. Takamine served as chief technical advisor for the company, which later was renamed to Dai Nippon Artificial Fertilizer Company. The company changed the corporate name from Nissan Chemical Industries, Ltd. to Nissan Chemical Corporation on July 1, 2018.

Business segments
The four main businesses of Nissan Chemical are Chemicals, Performance Materials, Agricultural Materials and Pharmaceuticals. Among the company's products are LCD display materials such as SUNEVER® and an external antiparasite drug for animals called Fluralaner, which is an active ingredient in the veterinary pharmaceutical "BRAVECTO®", developed by MSD Animal Health (MSD), the global animal health business of Merck & Co., Ltd.

References

External links

 

Chemical companies based in Tokyo
Companies listed on the Tokyo Stock Exchange
Chemical companies established in 1887
Japanese companies established in 1887
Japanese brands